Phaedinus is a genus of beetles in the family Cerambycidae, containing the following species:

 Phaedinus abnormalis Tippmann, 1953
 Phaedinus carbonelli Monné, 1999
 Phaedinus corallinus Gounelle, 1911
 Phaedinus flavipes (Thunberg, 1822)
 Phaedinus hirtipes Tippmann, 1960
 Phaedinus lanio Guérin-Méneville, 1838
 Phaedinus martii (Perty, 1832)
 Phaedinus pictus White, 1853
 Phaedinus rubrus Galileo & Martins, 2010
 Phaedinus schaufussi Nonfried, 1890
 Phaedinus tricolor Dupont in Audinet-Serville, 1834

References

Trachyderini
Cerambycidae genera